The Arsenal Player of the Season award is an official award given by Arsenal Football Club to the best performing player from the club over the course of the season. The award is given based on votes by Arsenal fans on the club's website, it was previously based on votes by the Arsenal Supporters' Trust.

The inaugural award was handed to Frank McLintock in 1967 and it has been presented every season since. The 2015–16 and 2016–17 awards were officially called the Vitality Arsenal Player of the Season Award for sponsorship purposes. The award has been given to 41 different players over the course of 56 seasons, with 11 players being awarded on more than one occasion. Of these players, only Thierry Henry has won the award four times, and he is also the only player to have won the award in three consecutive years. In 1976, Republic of Ireland international Liam Brady became the first Arsenal player from outside the United Kingdom to win the award and in 1997, Dutch international Dennis Bergkamp became the first player from outside the British Isles to receive it. Following the 2014−15 season, Chilean international Alexis Sánchez was voted to become the first player from outside of Europe to win the award. 

Bukayo Saka is the most recent winner of the award, following the 2021–22 Arsenal season.

Award recipients

Players in bold are still playing for Arsenal

Multiple wins

Wins by nationality

Wins by playing position

See also
 List of Arsenal F.C. players
 List of Arsenal F.C. players (25–99 appearances)
 List of Arsenal F.C. players (1–24 appearances)

References

Arsenal F.C.-related lists
 
Association football player of the year awards by club in England
Association football player non-biographical articles